Kaspars Gorkšs (born 6 November 1981) is a Latvian former professional footballer who played as a defender. Gorkšs was also the captain of the Latvia national team. From 2018 to 2019 Gorkšs served as president of the Latvian Football Federation.

Gorkšs firstly established himself in his native Latvia before moving to English football in 2006 with Blackpool. He has twice won promotion to the Premier League, with Queens Park Rangers and Reading.

Club career

Early career
Born in Riga, Gorkšs began his career at FK Auda, scoring nine goals in 77 appearances. After a week-long trial, he joined Swedish club, Östers IF in December 2002, playing in the Allsvenskan, the Swedish top flight. He moved to Assyriska Föreningen in 2005, who were then in the Allsvenskan. He moved back to Latvia in 2006, signing for FK Ventspils, and he scored five goals for Ventspils in the clubs Championship winning 2006 Virslīga season. He also played for Ventspils in the second qualifying round of the 2006–07 UEFA Cup, against English Premier League club Newcastle United.

Blackpool
Gorkšs moved to Championship side Blackpool on 1 January 2007 having already agreed the transfer during December. On 20 August 2007, Gorkšs was named in the Press Association's Championship "Team of the Week". Eight days later, Gorkšs scored his first goals for Blackpool in a League Cup second-round tie at Derby County. The Latvian's two goals were both equalisers – one in normal time and one in extra time – in a game that went to a penalty-shootout, won by Blackpool 7–6. On 1 October, Gorkšs was again named in the Press Association's The Championship "Team of the Week".

Gorkšs scored his first league goal for Blackpool, in their 1–0 victory over Scunthorpe United at Bloomfield Road on 10 November 2007. On 29 December 2007, he was named as runner-up in the annual Latvian Player of the Year Awards by the Latvian Football Federation behind the winner, Vitālijs Astafjevs of Skonto. He was named in The Championship "Team of the Week" for a third time on 25 February 2008, alongside teammate Stephen McPhee, and again on 10 March. He was named as the Yorkshire Seasiders Player of the Year on 6 May. The following day, Blackpool activated an option to extend his contract with the club by one year.

Following the season, his first full season in English football, in which he had become a regular in the Blackpool side and scored seven goals, Gorkšs was linked with moves to various clubs, including Scottish Premier League club Rangers, as well as fellow Championship clubs Burnley, Crystal Palace, Norwich City, Preston North End and Watford; however, he dismissed the moves as just rumours, stating, "From my point of view it's just a case of carrying on and seeing what happens, that's all I can really do." On 29 May, both he and fellow Blackpool player Wes Hoolahan were linked with a move to Norwich City.

Queens Park Rangers

On 12 June 2008, Queens Park Rangers confirmed that they had made an official bid to sign Gorkšs. However, on 17 June, Blackpool issued a brief statement, stating that they had reported QPR to the Football Association, and the Football League, for what they claimed was an illegal approach for Gorkšs. Blackpool manager Simon Grayson stated, "we've got to protect the interests of our club and we're led to believe there's been an illegal approach." On 18 June, the Football League, who would be adjudicating on the matter, confirmed that they could block the move, if QPR were found to have "tapped up the player", and that the matter could be referred to a disciplinary commission.

On 4 July, it was incorrectly reported in the Latvian media that Gorkšs had signed a contract with QPR. QPR announced on their official website that they had been given permission to speak with the player, and that he had agreed personal terms. However, this was strongly denied by Blackpool, whose club chairman, Karl Oyston stated, "We definitely have not given them permission to speak to him. I'm disappointed once again with the way they've gone about their business." The statement on the QPR official website was later removed.

On 28 July, Gorkšs completed his move to Loftus Road for a fee of £250,000, with Daniel Nardiello (permanent) and Zesh Rehman (loan) going the other way as part of the deal. He scored his first goal on 7 November 2009 in their 2–1 away win against Sheffield Wednesday.

In September 2010, he signed a two-year extension with the club.

Reading
On 24 August 2011, Gorkšs signed for Reading on a three-year contract.
In his first season with the club he made 42 appearances in all competitions, scoring three goals and helping Reading win the 2011–12 Football League Championship. This was the second time he had won the trophy having won it the previous year with QPR. He scored his first goal in the Premier League on 4 November 2012 in a 1–1 draw against his former side QPR.

On 12 February 2013, Gorkšs joined Championship club Wolverhampton Wanderers on an emergency loan that ran until the end of the season, with a view to a permanent move at its conclusion. He made fifteen appearances for the club as they suffered relegation to League One.

Gorkšs was released by Reading at the end of the 2013–14 season having played 87 games for the club, scoring eight times.

Colchester United
Gorkšs signed a short-term contract with League One club Colchester United during the first week of December 2014, and went straight in to their first-team squad to face Peterborough United in the second round of the FA Cup on 7 December. He made an important block from an Aaron McLean attempt in the fixture, playing the full 90 minutes as the U's came out 1–0 victors and into the third round of the cup. Gorkšs signed an extension to his short-term deal with the U's on 10 January, following doubt that he would remain with the club following his previous contracts expiry.

Gorkšs scored his first goal for Colchester on 24 January in a crunch relegation battle game against Leyton Orient at the Colchester Community Stadium. He headed the ball home from a David Fox corner two minutes after the interval in the 2–0 victory.

Ergotelis
On 29 January 2015, Gorkšs signed an 18-month contract with the Superleague Greece club Ergotelis. Gorkšs scored his first goal for Ergotelis in his second match for the club, securing a 3–2 victory in the Cretan derby over OFI Crete.

Dukla
Gorkšs joined Czech First League side FK Dukla Prague in September 2015, signing a one-year contract.

International career
Gorkšs has played for the Latvian Under-21 team and he made his debut for Latvia on 24 December 2005 against Thailand in the 36th annual King's Cup in Phang Nga, Thailand. On 11 October 2006, in a Euro 2008 qualifier against Northern Ireland, Gorkšs started the second half in place of Māris Smirnovs. In February 2007 he played for Latvia in the annual Cyprus International Football Tournament. On 6 February, he played the full 90 minutes of Latvia's 2–0 defeat by Bulgaria in the semi finals of the tournament. And the following day he played in the third place play-off match against Hungary which they also lost 2–0. On 28 March 2007, Gorkšs played for Latvia in their 2008 UEFA European Football Championship qualifier 1–0 defeat by Liechtenstein. On 22 August 2007, Gorkšs played for Latvia in their friendly 2–1 defeat in Riga by Moldova. He scored his first goal for Latvia on 17 October 2007, against Denmark.

Gorkšs announced his retirement from the Latvia national football team on 31 October 2017.

Personal life
Gorkšs has two children. His first child, a daughter Luīze, was born in 2005 and his second child, a son, Patriks, was born in Riga on 16 October 2007. His two brothers, Jorens Gorkšs and Rihards Gorkšs, both play for his former club FK Auda, whilst his father, Juris Gorkšs, is the club's chairman. In July 2012 Gorkšs opened a restaurant Koya, located in the Andrejsala district, Riga, Latvia.

Career statistics

Club

International

Scores and results list Latvia's goal tally first, score column indicates score after each Gorkšs goal.

Honours
Ventspils
 Latvian Higher League champion: 2006

Blackpool
 League One play-off final winner: 2006–07

Queens Park Rangers
 Football League Championship Winners: Promotion to the FA Premier League: 2010–2011

Reading
 Football League Championship Winners: Promotion to the FA Premier League: 2011–2012

Individual
 Championship "Team of the Week" (6): 20 August 2007, 1 October 2007, 25 February 2008, 10 March 2008, 27 September 2010, 16 April 2012.
 Latvian Footballer of the Year: 2009, 2010

References

External links

1981 births
Living people
Footballers from Riga
Association football defenders
Latvian footballers
Latvia international footballers
Latvian expatriate footballers
Latvian Higher League players
Allsvenskan players
Superettan players
English Football League players
Premier League players
Super League Greece players
Czech First League players
FK Ventspils players
Östers IF players
Blackpool F.C. players
Queens Park Rangers F.C. players
Reading F.C. players
Wolverhampton Wanderers F.C. players
Colchester United F.C. players
Ergotelis F.C. players
FK Auda players
Assyriska FF players
FK Dukla Prague players
Latvian expatriate sportspeople in Sweden
Latvian expatriate sportspeople in England
Latvian expatriate sportspeople in Greece
Expatriate footballers in Sweden
Expatriate footballers in England
Expatriate footballers in Greece
Latvian sports executives and administrators